Vision Quest is the debut album by American jazz flautist Nicole Mitchell with her group Black Earth Ensemble, which was released in 2001 on Dreamtime, the label she established with David Boykin.

Reception

In his review for AllMusic, Alain Drouot states "Her pieces display her knack for pretty melodies full of spirituality and poetry, whether they take the form of a reverie or are developed over a solid groove."

The Exclaim! review by David Dacks says "Vision Quest is both dissonant and groovy all the way through, and that is worth celebrating."

Track listing
All compositions by Nicole Mitchell
 "Sanctuary: Aaya's Rainbow" – 7:11
 "Vision Quest Part One: Seeking Enlightenment" – 6:06
 "Vision Quest Parts Two/Three: Journey of Discovery/The Unknown " – 4:10
 "Episodes of an Obscure Life Episode One" – 3:57
 "Episodes of an Obscure Life Episodes Two/Three" – 3:11
 "Daddy Gone" – 6:27
 "Bird of Desire" – :23
 "Sweet Tooth" – 3:13
 "Off the Clock" – 5:36
 "For the Brave" – 2:26
 "On the Nile" – 15:42
 "Tale of Youth's Adventures" – 6:34
 "The Bath" – 8:42

Personnel
Nicole Mitchell – alto flute, flute, piccolo, flutaphone, vocals
Savoir Faire – violin, viola
Darius Savage – bass
Hamid Drake – percussion 
Arveeayl Ra – percussion
Edith Yokley – violin

References

2001 live albums
Nicole Mitchell (musician) live albums